Big Buck Hunter is a hunting video game developed by Play Mechanix, Inc. Primarily developed for arcades, the goal of the game is to shoot moving bucks without shooting a doe or female animal.

The Incredible Technologies' initial series of games from December 2000 – 2005 operated on a single gun platform and allowed four players to compete round robin style through various treks and bonus stages. Raw Thrills' Big Buck Hunter Pro and Big Buck Safari introduced a two gun platform, allowing head-to-head competition in addition to a variety of new animals and critters to hunt.

Gameplay
Inspired by Duck Hunt, the game's goal is to shoot the male animals as they run across the screen. The round ends when a female one is shot. Each scene will begin with a couple of animals walking without any suspicions. After a first shot is done, the animals will begin running and the hunt starts. Big Buck Hunter is separated in five screens, also known as "treks". A hunting sessions concludes in a bonus round. The players can either participate solo or one on one by using two plastic rifles. How much points will be earned depends on certain factors like distance, weight and accuracy. There are different states to choose from with a variety of animals, like antelope or moose. The hunting can be done in different conditions varying from fog to snow, with overall 16 bonus rounds. All of the Big Buck HD machines are networked so they can track the players' rankings through online leaderboards. Big Buck HD was the first edition to integrate Facebook and Twitter. That allows players to share and compare scores and awards via social networks.

Tournaments
Big Buck Hunter game cabinets that are connected to the CoinUp Network can support local and national tournaments. If a game cabinet is participating in a current tournament, the 'Tournaments' button will appear on the first Game Selection Screen. After selecting the Tournament button, the player can scroll through all tournaments currently playing on that game cabinet. For Big Buck Hunter Pro & Safari, the National Tournaments ran monthly (usually from the 7th to the 27th of each month for Pro and the 1st to the 21st of each month for Safari until the end of 2012). National Tournaments did return to Big Buck HD WILD for a short time in 2017 and 2018, but on a weekly basis with a particular theme for each month. Players can find out about current tournament, prizes, participating locations and follow their tournament ranking at the Big Buck Hunter Website. Operators can also choose to set up their own custom tournaments for Big Buck HD, Wild, & Reloaded games that they own via the CoinUp website. They can choose the prizes, cost, sites, and bonuses they desire and assign them to desired units.

Beginning in 2008, a World Championship Tournament was introduced. It brings in 64 people from all over the world in an elimination tournament, where the highest rated players in each region get to earn an invite for the event. Regional Qualifying tournaments occur in August and September, with winners advancing to the World Championship Tournament, which occurs every fall in cities like Chicago, New York City, Minneapolis, Austin, & Las Vegas. On November 10, 2012, the Big Buck Hunter World Tournament was held in the Altman Building in New York City.

Starting in 2013, players would no longer be divided by region, and instead they would have to play 5 national tournaments. Each tournament was themed to a specific animal for the 2013 and 2014 Qualifiers. Their 10 best scores in each tournament would determine where they ended up on the leaderboard. The Ladies' Tourney, introduced in 2011, had its own qualifier tournament as well. Starting in 2015, the qualifier would start as early as May, with a new tournament unlocking at the start of every month, and the tournaments were changed so that they would use random animals since this was the first year where there were more than 5 animals in Big Buck HD. In 2016 and 2017, the tournaments were animal themed once again, with each tournament having 1 or 2 animals in them. Australia & Canada also had their own national tournaments to determine who would move on.

In May 2018, Pro mode was introduced. This mode was designed to allow easier World Championship qualification. The player's top 5 scores on each Trek of each animal determines where they rank on the Skill leaderboard for the Qualifier Season (on Reloaded machines it is their top 3 scores obtained with the gun and their top 2 scores obtained with the bow). If they are not eligible for the Skill leaderboard but have a sufficient cumulative score, they would be on the Wildcard leaderboard. If a player is female, their scores would count for both the World Championship and Ladies' Tourney. Also, any region can participate in Pro mode, and they are no longer locked into their own leaderboards. With Pro mode becoming a core part of the game, the qualifier would start in November, and end in September, with the World Championship happening in October.

Development
The game is intended for the adult drinking community, hence it is being marketed more to be used at bars than arcades.

Big Buck Hunter'''s concept came from George Petro, the Play Mechanix's founder and the former staff of Midway Games, while thinking about what to do next with the company. After the release of Midway's Invasion: The Abductors in 1999, Petro thought that hunting games were popular in homes but there was also a lack of those in arcades. He pitched the idea to the design team, and shortly after started developing the prototype with Incredible Technologies doing the manufacture of the arcade machine. Incredible Technologies partnered with Play Mechanix to create the rest of the games until Call of the Wild in 2005.

Outside of Big Buck Hunter, Innovative Concepts in Entertainment (ICE) partnered with Play Mechanix to develop eight games: Special Forces: Elite Training (2003), Johnny Nero Action Hero (2004), Rhythm Nation (2005), Zoofari (2006), Deal or No Deal (2007), Ice Age: Ice Breaker (2012), Angry Birds Arcade (2016), and Pink Panther: Jewel Heist (2017)

Needing financial support to do an improved version of the game called Big Buck Hunter Pro, the developers contacted Raw Thrills in 2006. As a part of the agreement, Play Mechanix got a design role, while Raw Thrills took over the production and distribution. Raw Thrills was also involved with Big Buck Safari, which introduced hunting in Africa, as well as trophy hunting, which included animals such as zebras, elephants, hippos, and other big animals. They released Open Season in 2009, which added more animals to Pro. In 2010, a year later, Big Buck World was released to celebrate the 10th anniversary of Big Buck Hunter. It combined Open Season & Outback (the upgrade to Safari) into one cabinet.

In 2012, they released Big Buck HD, which combined elements from Pro & Safari and presented them in 1080p high-definition graphics, and added groundbreaking online features such as the ability to compete with players from other locations live, improved tournaments, and easier account creation. A Duck Dynasty-themed side game was added in 2013.

In 2015, Big Buck HD WILD came out, which added 3 new animals (which were released separately by year) as well as a zombie-themed shooter. A 4th animal was added in 2018.

In 2020, Big Buck Hunter Reloaded was released and added more stuff to Big Buck HD. In addition to a new animal, 2 new side games were introduced, including a sequel to the zombie game as well as a partial remake of Terminator Salvation, which was released in 2010. And it also presented a brand new player interface to make it easy to navigate.

List of arcade games

Big Buck Hunter: (2000)

Big Buck Hunter: Shooter's Challenge: (2002)

Big Buck Hunter II: Sportsman's Paradise: (2002)

Big Buck Hunter 2006: Call of the Wild: (2005)

Big Buck Hunter Pro: (2006)

Big Buck Safari: (2008)

Big Buck Hunter Pro Open Season: (2009)

Big Buck World: (2010)

Big Buck HD: (2012)

Big Buck HD WILD: (2015)

Big Buck Hunter Reloaded: (2020)

Release
It spawned a series of new arcade versions including Big Buck Hunter Pro and Big Buck Safari. In 2012, Big Buck HD was released. It includes elements from both Big Buck Hunter Pro and Big Buck Safari in high-definition. In 2009, an iOS version of Big Buck Hunter Pro was released. Following that, an iOS version of Big Buck Safari was released in 2011. GameMill Entertainment released parts of Big Buck HD WILD as Big Buck Hunter Arcade for Microsoft Windows, PlayStation 4, and Xbox One in 2016, and for Nintendo Switch in 2018. Play Mechanix also made a partnership with Tastemakers LLC in 2019, and both had announced that Big Buck Hunter Pro arcade will be part of Arcade1Up lineup in Fall 2020.

The developers partnered with Anheuser-Busch InBev, offering a special permit that unlocks a special "Great White Buck" level. The money earned from purchases of those went to the National Forest Foundation to help preserving forests in the United States. Big Buck Hunter'' has sold around 7,500 units in 2006.

References

External links
 Official website

2000 video games
Arcade video games
GameMill Entertainment games
Hunting video games
IOS games
Light gun games
Nintendo Switch games
PlayStation 4 games
Video games developed in the United States
Wii games
Windows games
Xbox One games